Sheykhlar (also Romanized as Shaikhlar and Shaykhlyar) is a village in Kuhgir Rural District, Tarom Sofla District, Qazvin County, Qazvin Province, Iran. At the 2006 census, its population was 72, in 22 families.

References 

Populated places in Qazvin County